Sri Vyasaraja Math  (formerly known as Poorvadi Math) is one of the three premier Dvaita Vedanta monasteries (matha) descended from Jagadguru Śrī Madhvācārya through Jayatirtha and Rajendra Tirtha (a disciple of Vidyadhiraja Tirtha)  and their disciples.

Vyasaraja Math, along with Uttaradi Math and Raghavendra Math , are considered to be the three premier apostolic institutions of Dvaita Vedanta and are jointly referred as Mathatraya . It is the pontiffs and pandits of the Mathatraya that have been the principle architects of post-Madhva Dvaita Vedanta through the centuries. Among the mathas outside of Tulu Nadu region, after Uttaradi Matha, Vyasaraja Matha is the largest.

Guru Parampara

 Śrī Madhvacharya 
 Śrī Padmanabha Tirtha
 Śrī Naraharitirtha 
 Śrī  Madhava Tirtha 
 Śrī Akshobhya Tirtha
 Śrī Jayatirtha 
 Śrī Vidyadhiraja Tirtha
 Śrī Rajendra Tīrtha
 Śrī Jayadwaja Tīrtha
 Śrī Purushothama Tīrtha
 Śrī Bramhanya Tīrtha
 Śrī Śrī Vyasa Tīrtha (or Sri Chandrikacharya)
 Śrī Srinivasa Tīrtha
 Śrī Rama Tīrtha
 Śrī Lakshmikantha Tīrtha
 Śrī Sripathi Tīrtha
 Śrī Ramachandra Tīrtha
 Śrī Lakshmivallabha Tīrtha
 Śrī Lakshminatha Tīrtha
 Śrī Lakshmipathi Tīrtha
 Śrī Lakshminarayana Tīrtha
 Śrī Raghunatha Tīrtha (or Sri Sheshachandrikacharya)
 Śrī Jagannatha Tīrtha (or Sri Bhashyadeepikacharya)
 Śrī Srinatha Tīrtha
 Śrī Vidyanatha Tīrtha
 Śrī Vidyapathi Tīrtha
 Śrī Vidyavallabha Tīrtha
 Śrī Vidyakaantha Tīrtha
 Śrī Vidyanidhi Tīrtha
 Śrī Vidyapurna Tīrtha
 Śrī Vidyasrisindhu Tīrtha
 Śrī Vidyasridhara Tīrtha
 Śrī Vidyasrinivasa Tīrtha
 Śrī Vidyasamudra Tīrtha
 Śrī Vidyaratnakara Tīrtha
 Śrī Vidyavaridhi Tīrtha
 Śrī Vidyaprasanna Tirtha
 Śrī Vidyapayonidhi Tīrtha
 Śrī Vidyavachaspathi Tīrtha
 Śri Vidyamanohara Tirtha (Peeta Thyaga)
 Śri Vidyasreesha Tirtha (present pontiff)

Present Pontiff
Mahamahopadhya Prof. D.Prahladacharya, Former Vice-Chancellor of Rashtreeya Samskrit Vidyapeeta, Tirupati was crowned as the new with the pontifical name of Sri VidyaSrisha Tirtharu on 2 July 2017 at Tirumakudalu, Mysore, Karnataka.

References

External links
 http://www.dvaita.org

Dvaita Vedanta
History of Karnataka
Vaishnavism
Vedanta
Hindu monasteries in India
Madhva mathas